Chikhaldara is a hill station and a municipal council in Amravati district in the Indian state of Maharashtra.

Chikaldhara, literally translates from Marathi to mud stream/falls (chikal + dhara). Hindus claim that this place was featured in the epic of the Mahabharata, this is the place where Bheema killed the villainous Keechaka in a herculean bout and then threw him into the valley. It thus came to be known as Keechakadara which eventually colloquialised to Chikaldhara. But there's not much evidence apart from hearsay to support that argument, nevertheless, it's an interesting story.

The sole hill resort in the Vidarbha region, it is situated at an altitude of 1118 meters with highest vairat point 1188 meters and has the added dimension of being the only coffee-growing area in Maharashtra. Chikhaldara has an annual rainfall of 154cm. Temperatures vary from 39C in summer to 5C in winter. The best months to visit are from October to June.

It abounds in wildlife, such as tigers, panthers, sloth bears, sambars, wild boar, and rarely seen wild dogs. Close by is the famous Melghat Tiger Project which has 82 tigers.

The scenic beauty of Chikhaldara can be enjoyed from Hurricane Point, Prospect Point, and Devi Point. Other interesting excursions include Gavilgad and Narnala Fort, the Pandit Nehru Botanical Gardens, the Tribal Museum and the Semadoh Lake

Events and Festivals in Chikhaldara

Since the area is heavily forested and the population count is low there are no big festivals in Chikhaldara like in the rest of India. Only at the Jain temples that exist in the area, the pujas are held regularly.

Accommodation in Chikhaldara

Here in the city, one can get high-class accommodation facilities. Famous hotels situated here include such as Green Vallies Resort, Satpura Retreat Hotel, Harshawardhan Hotel, MTDC Holiday Resort Chikhaldara, Resort Mayura and others.

Hotels in Chikhaldara

Chikhaldara is a tiny hill station in the Indian state of Maharashtra. As it is the only coffee-growing area in the region, it is loved by many tourists who come solely to taste the regions’ coffee. Apart from the coffee plantations, Chikhaldara boasts of quiet lakes, waterfalls, old forts, divine temples  mesmerising viewpoints.

History
Chikhaldara was discovered by Captain Robinson of the Hyderabad Regiment in 1823. The Englishmen found it particularly attractive because the lush green hue of the place reminded them of England. When the leaves fell in September/October, they were reminded of autumn in England. There was even a proposal to make it the seat of the Government of India. British Commander selected leader of Chikhaldara named Mr.Sheikh Mehtab, who was landlord of Chikhaldara. He distributed land free of cost to Adivasis to build their houses. He ruled Chikhaldara for many years.

Climate
June, July, August, and September are the four months of Monsoon. Chikhaldara experiences heavy rainfall during these months. The average temperature during monsoon is twenty-five degree celsius and during winter it goes below 15°C.  Summer is not pleasant in this place because the temperature is very high . It is good not to visit Chikhaldara during summer because the temperature here lies between 32°C to 40°C.

According to Köppen climate classification, climate of Chikhaldara is categorized as Humid Subtropical, Cwa. Chikhaldara has four distinct seasons - Winter, Summer (Late winter and early summer can be called spring but is of very short duration), Monsoon (Rainy season) and Post-monsoon or Autumn. Summers are hot and long, from mid-March to Early June. Summer temperature varies from 16°C to 41°C. Monsoon starts in early June and lasts till early October. July and October are wettest months. Chikhaldara receives averagely 1600 mm of rainfall annually. Mist following morning rain is common. Monsoon temperature ranges from 18°C to 26°C. Post-Monsoon starts mid-October and lasts till mid-November. Autumn, which is a transition between Post-Monsoon and Winter, is of short duration and lasts from mid-November to mid-December. Temperature during post monsoon and autumn ranges from 12°C to 30°C. Winters of Chikhaldara are mild with chilly, foggy mornings; pleasant, clear and sunny days; hazy and calm evenings and hazy, cool nights. Temperature in winter ranges from 4°C to 23°C.

Demographics 

 India census, Chikhaldara had a population of 4711. Males constituted 58% of the population and females 42%. Chikhaldara had an average literacy rate of 80%, higher than the national average of 59.5%, with male literacy at 86% and female literacy at 72%. 12% of the population was under 6 years of age.

Water supply 
Water is supplied from Shakkar lake.

Local features of importance 
 Melghat Tiger Reserve, which includes the Gugamal National Park
 Gawilgad fort
 Bhim-kund, where Bhima washed his hands of the blood of Keechaka
 Forest garden
 Wildlife museum
 Paratwada City

Tourist points

 Malviya point (sunrise)
 Bhimkund (Kitchakdari)
 Vairat Devi
 Sunset Point
 Bir Dam
 Panchbol Point
 Kalapani Dam
 Mahadev Mandir
 Semadhoh Tiger Project
 Hariken Point
 Mozari Point
 Prospects Point
 Devi Point
 Goraghat
 Shakkar Lake
 Government Garden
 Museums
 Waterfalls
 Dharkhora
 Bakadari
 Muktagiri
 Kolkaz
 Pancha Dharag waterfall
 Gawilgad Fort

Connectivity 
Chikhaldara is well connected to the cities of Paratwada, Amravati, Akola, Betul (M.P.), Khandwa (M.P.) by road. The nearest airport is Nagpur: 229 km via Paratwada-Chandur Bazar-Katol route and 231 km via Paratwada-Amravati-Kondhali route. MSRTC plies buses from Nagpur to Chikhaldara via Amravati-Paratwada.

References

External links 
 Chikhaldara.org
 https://infosutra.in/chikhaldara-places-to-visit-chikhaldara-hill-station/

Geography of Maharashtra
Cities and towns in Amravati district
Talukas in Maharashtra